Israel Academy of Sciences and Humanities, based in Jerusalem, was established in 1961 by the State of Israel to foster contact between Israeli scholars in the sciences and humanities and  create a think tank for advising  the government on research projects of national importance. Its members include many of Israel's most distinguished scholars.

The offices of the Israel Academy of Sciences and Humanities are located next door to the official residence of the President of Israel and the Council for Higher Education in Israel in Albert Einstein Square in Jerusalem.

In the sciences, the Academy funds projects on the geology, flora, and fauna of Israel, and facilitates the participation of Israeli scientists in research at international projects, such as high-energy physics at CERN and synchrotron radiation at the European Synchrotron Radiation Facility. Israel has the highest concentration of scientists and engineers in the world. The academy funds a number of prestigious awards in the sciences including the Alon Prize.

In the humanities, research is funded into the study of the Tanakh and Talmud, Jewish history, Jewish philosophy, Jewish art, and the Hebrew language, as well as Hebrew prose and poetry.

The Academy administers the Einstein Fellowships fund, which fosters relations between scientists from around the world and the Israeli academic community, the Israel Science Fund, with an annual budget of $53 million, and a number of research funds based on grants from the Adler Fund for Space Research, the Wolf Foundation, and the Fulks Fund for Medical Research. The Academy also runs the Israel Academic Center in Cairo, which assists Israeli scholars with research into Egypt and Egyptian culture, and facilitates cooperation with Egyptian academics.

The Academy has observer status at the European Science Foundation, and runs exchange programs with the British Royal Society, the British Academy, the Swedish Academy, and the National Research Council of Singapore.

Members

Present (partial)

 Shraga Abramson,		    Talmud
 Shaul Adler,		        Parasitology
 Shmuel Agmon,		        Mathematics
 Yakir Aharonov,	    	Physics
 Shlomo Alexander,		    Physics
 Noga Alon,		        Mathematics
 Ruth Arnon,		        Immunology
 Shlomo Avineri,           Political science
 Robert Aumann,		    Mathematics, Nobel Prize (2005) in Economics
 David Ayalon,		        History of Muslim People
 Aharon Barak,		        Law
 Yehuda Bauer,		        Holocaust Studies
 Malachi Beit-Arie,        Palaeography
 Zeev Ben-Hayyim,		    Hebrew Studies
 Joseph Bernstein,		    Mathematics
 Yehudith Birk,		    Agricultural Biochemistry
 Joshua Blau,		        Arabic Language and Literature
 Haim (Howard) Cedar, Biochemistry, Molecular Cell Biology, Molecular Genetics
 Ilan Chet,		        Agricultural Biotechnology
 Aaron Ciechanover,	    Biochemistry, Nobel Prize (2004) in Chemistry
 Nili Cohen,		        Law
 Solly Cohen,		Experimental Physics
 Yadin Dudai,              Neurobiology
 Itzhak Englard,		    Law
 Michael Feldman, Molecular Cell Biology
 Margalit Finkelberg,      Classical Philology
 Israel Finkelstein,       Archaeology
 Yohanan Friedmann,	    Islamic Studies
 Daniel Friedmann,		    Law
 Mordechai Akiva Friedman, Talmud 
 Dov Frohman,		        Applied physics
 Hillel Furstenberg,	    Mathematics
 Gideaon Goldenberg,	    Linguistics and Semitic Languages
 Amiram Grinvald,		    Neurobiology
 Yoram Groner,		        Molecular biology
 Abraham Grossman,	    	Jewish Studies
 Don Handelman,		    Anthropology, Sociology
 Menahem Haran,		    Bible
 Haim Harari,		        Natural sciences
 David Harel,              Natural Sciences
 Ehud Hrushovski,          Mathematics
 Elhanan Helpman,		    Economics
 Avram Hershko,		    Biochemistry, medicine, Nobel Prize (2005) in Chemistry
 Yoseph Imry,		        Physics
 Benjamin Isaac,		    History
 Joshua Jortner,		    Chemistry
 Yosef Kaplan,		        Jewish Studies, History
 Benjamin Kedar,		    History
 Eitan Kohlberg,		    Asian and African Studies
 Asher Koriat,		        Psychology
 Raphael Levine,		    Chemistry
 Alexander Levitzki,	    Biological chemistry
 Alexander Lubotzky,       Mathematics
 Raphael Mechoulam,	    Chemistry
 David Milstein,	        Chemistry
 David Navon,		        Psychology
 Ruth Nevo,		        English Literature
 Abraham Nitzan,           Chemistry
 Ariel Porat,              Law
 Michael O. Rabin,		    Mathematics
 Ariel Rubinstein,		    Economics
 Leo Sachs,		        Biology
 Michael Sela,		        Immunology
 Uri Seligson,		        Hematology
 Shaul Shaked,		        Iranian Studies, Religious Studies
 Adi Shamir,		        Applied mathematics
 Dan Shechtman,		    Materials Engineering
 Saharon Shelah,		    Mathematics
 Uri Sivan,                
 Yechezkel Stein,		    Medicine
 Izchak Steinberg,		    Physical Chemistry
 Zehev Tadmor,		        Chemical Engineering  polymers
 Igal Talmi,		        Particle Physics
 Daniel Weihs,
 Meir Wilchek,		        Biophysics
 Itamar Wilner,		    Chemistry
 Menahem Yaari,		    Economy
 Ada Yonath,		        Structural Biology, Nobel Prize (2009) in Chemistry
 Moshe Zakai,		        Electrical Engineering
 Jacob Ziv,		        Electrical Engineering

Past (partial)

 Hanoch Albeck,		 Talmud
 Shimshon Amitsur,		 Mathematics
 David Asheri,		     Classical Studies
 Haim Beinart,		     Jewish Studies
 Jacob Bekenstein,		 Physics
 Zvi Ben-Avraham,		 Geophysics
 Michael Confino,		 Russian and Eastern-European History
 Hillel Daleski,		 English Literature
 Amos de-Shalit,		 Physics
 Ben-Zion Dinur,		 Jewish Studies
 Israel Dostrovsky,	 Physical Chemistry
 Aryeh Dvoretzky,		 Mathematics
 Shmuel Eisenstadt,	 Sociology
 Ezra Fleisher,		 Hebrew Literature
 David Flusser,		 Religious Studies
 Abraham Fraenkel,		 Mathematics
 Tedeschi Gaido,		 Civil Justice
 David Ginsburg, Chemistry
 Jonas Greenfield,		 Linguistics and Semitic Languages
 Louis Guttman,		 Sociology
 Georg Haas, Zoology
 Aaron Katzir,		     Physical Chemistry
 Ephraim Katzir,		 Biophysics
 Yehezkel Kaufman,		 Bible
 Abraham Kogan,		 Aeronautics
 Dorothea Krook-Gilead, American Literature, English Literature
 Jacob Licht,		     Bible
 Saul Lieberman,		 Talmud
 Schneior Lifson,		 Physical Chemistry
 Yoram Lindenstrauss,	 Mathematics
 Hans Lindner, Physiology
 Zvi Lipkin,		     Physics
 Benjamin Mazar,		 Archeology, Jewish Studies
 Isaac Michaelson,		 Ophthalmology
 Shlomo Morag,		     Hebrew Language
 Yosef Naveh,		     Epigraphy, Palaeography
 Yuval Ne'eman,		 Astrophysics, physics
 Henry Neufeld,		 Cardiology
 Franz Ollendorff,		 Electronics, Electrical Research
 Don Patinkin,		     Economics
 Haim Pekeris,		     Applied Mathematics
 Ilya Piatetski-Shapiro,	Mathematics
 Yehuda Picard,		 Geology
 Shlomo Pines,		     Philosophy
 Amir Pnueli,		     Applied mathematics
 Hans Jakob Polotsky,	 Linguistics
 Joshua Prawer,		 History
 Gulio Racah,		     Physics
 Markus Reiner,		 Theoretical and Applied Mechanics (deceased 1976)
 Haiim B. Rosén,		 Linguistics
 Nathan Rosen,		     Physics
 Nathan Rosenstreich,	 Philosophy
 Dov Sadan,		     Yiddish Language and Literature
 Jefim Schirmann,		 Hebrew Literature
 Gershon Scholem,		 Jewish Mysticism
 Moshe Segal,		     Bible
 Gershon Shaked,		Hebrew Literature
 Nathan Sharon,		Molecular Biology
 Ariel Shisha-Halevy,	Linguistics
 Chone Shmeruk,		Yiddish Literature
 Shmuel Shtrikman,		Applied Physics
 Menahem Stern,		Jewish Studies
 Hayim Tadmor,		    Assyriology, History of the Ancient Near East
 Jacob Talmon,		    Modern History
 Yoram Tsafrir,		Archeology
 Naftali Herz Tur-Sinai,	Hebrew Language
 Efraim Urbach,		Talmud
 Haim Werthheimer,		Pathologic Physiology
 Chaim Wirzubski,		Classical Studies
 Israel Yeivin,		Hebrew Language
 Michael Zohary,		Natural Sciences Botany
 Bernhard Zondek,		Natural Sciences Obstetrics

References

External links

"Israel Academy of Sciences and Humanities" Israel Ministry of Foreign Affairs, May 24, 1999
 "About the Israel Academy of Sciences and Humanities" International Stem Cell Forum, retrieved August 16, 2005

1961 establishments in Israel
Organizations established in 1961
Jewish Israeli culture
Education in Jerusalem
Organizations based in Jerusalem
National academies of sciences
National academies of arts and humanities

Israel
Israel-related lists
Scientific organizations established in 1961
Members of the International Council for Science
Members of the International Science Council